Stigmus americanus is a species of aphid wasp in the family Crabronidae. It is found in North America.

Stigmus americanus nest in twigs of certain trees and shrubs, including Erythrina, Paeonia, Sambucus, Chionanthus, Syringa, Prunus, Polyphorus, and Sassafras. They frequently utilize pre-existing cavities, but also excavate their own nests.

A Stigmus americanus wasp provisions its nest with paralyzed aphids, and places its eggs on the thoracic ventor and abdomen of the aphids in its nest. When an egg hatches, the larva feeds on the paralyzed aphid and eventually emerges from the aphid shell as an adult wasp.

The cuckoo wasps Omalus iridescens and O. purpuratus parasitize Stigmus americanus (along some other aphid wasps) by laying eggs in live aphids at a hunting site of Stigmus americanus, which then paralyzes the aphids and moves them to its nest along with the embedded eggs.

References

Crabronidae
Articles created by Qbugbot
Insects described in 1867